National Route 21 is a national highway in South Korea connects Namwon to Icheon. It established on 31 August 1971.

Main stopovers

North Jeolla Province
 Namwon - Sunchang County - Jeongeup - Gimje - Jeonju - Wanju County - Jeonju - Iksan - Gimje - Iksan - Gunsan
South Chungcheong Province
 Seocheon County - Boryeong - Hongseong County - Yesan County - Asan - Cheonan
North Chungcheong Province
 Jincheon County - Eumseong County
Gyeonggi Province
 Icheon

Major intersections

 (■): Motorway
IS: Intersection, IC: Interchange

North Jeolla Province

South Chungcheong Province

North Chungcheong Province

Gyeonggi Province

References

21
Roads in North Jeolla
Roads in South Chungcheong
Roads in North Chungcheong
Roads in Gyeonggi